Breaking Daylight is the second album by Finnish hip hop group Don Johnson Big Band. It topped the Finnish album charts and has been certified Platinum in Finland. Both singles released from the album reached top-ten on the singles chart.

Finnish singer Emma Salokoski is prominently featured on several tracks.

Track listing
"One MC, One Delay" - 3:10
"Penguin" - 4:27
"Royalty" - 5:14
"Harlem Davidson" - 4:12
"Behind 16 Bars" - 2:52
"Salt Water" - 3:49
"Nightman" - 7:28
"Northbound" - 5:16
"Tokyo Ranger" - 4:25
"Nutwood Cut" - 4:00
"Two Reasons" - 3:39
"Jah Jah Blow Job" - 4:24
"Broken Daylight" - 7:15

References

External links 
 

2000 albums